KCHA may refer to:

 KCHA (AM), a radio station (1580 AM) licensed to Charles City, Iowa, United States
 KCHA-FM, a radio station (95.9 FM) licensed to Charles City, Iowa, United States
 the ICAO code for Chattanooga Metropolitan Airport